The UK Albums Chart is one of many music charts compiled by the Official Charts Company that calculates the best-selling albums of the week in the United Kingdom. Since 2004 the chart has been based on the sales of both physical albums and digital downloads. This list shows albums that peaked in the Top 10 of the UK Albums Chart during 2007, as well as albums which peaked in 2006 and 2008 but were in the top 10 in 2007. The entry date is when the album appeared in the top 10 for the first time (week ending, as published by the Official Charts Company, which is six days after the chart is announced).

One-hundred and fifty-four albums were in the top ten this year. Eighteen albums from 2006 remained in the top 10 for several weeks at the beginning of the year, while Back to Black: Deluxe Edition by Amy Winehouse, Raising Sand by Robert Plant & Alison Krauss and This Is the Life by Amy Macdonald were both released in 2007 but did not reach their peak until 2008. Back to Black by Amy Winehouse and Loose by Nelly Furtado were the albums from 2006 to reach their peak in 2007. Seven artist scored multiple entries in the top 10 in 2007. Fall Out Boy, Leona Lewis, Mark Ronson, Ne-Yo and Timbaland were among the many artists who achieved their first UK charting top 10 album in 2007.

The 2006 Christmas number-one album, Beautiful World by Take That, remained at the top spot for the first two weeks of 2007. The first new number-one album of the year was Back to Black by Amy Winehouse. Overall, thirty-three different albums peaked at number-one in 2007, with thirty-three unique artists hitting that position.

Background

Multiple entries
One-hundred and fifty-four albums charted in the top 10 in 2007, with one-hundred and thirty-six albums reaching their peak this year (including ...Hits, Love Songs: A Compilation… Old and New, Never Forget – The Ultimate Collection and The Best of The Proclaimers, which charted in previous years but reached a peak on their latest chart run).

Six artists scored multiple entries in the top 10 in 2007. Phil Collins had three top 10 albums, while Amy Winehouse, The Killers, Kylie Minogue, Take That and Westlife were the acts who had two top 10 albums this year. Kylie Minogue and Michael Bublé's two entries were both released this year, with ...Hits (1998) and Love Songs: A Compilation… Old and New (2004) by Phil Collins and Never Forget – The Ultimate Collection (2005) by Take That returning after making the top ten before.

Chart debuts
Forty-two artists achieved their first top 10 album in 2007 as a lead artist.

The following table (collapsed on desktop site) does not include acts who had previously charted as part of a group and secured their first top 10 solo album, or featured appearances on compilations or other artists recordings.

Notes
Damon Albarn, Tony Allen, Paul Simonon and Simon Tong were all part of an unnamed supergroup which was penned as The Good, the Bad & the Queen on the album cover. Allen was the only member without a top 10 album before this point - Albarn had previous album success with Blur and Gorillaz, Simonon was bassist with The Clash while Tong featured in the group The Verve.

Mutya Buena left Sugababes in 2005 after three top 10 studio albums and a number 3 greatest hits album. Her debut solo effort, Real Girl, went straight in at number ten. Richard Hawley saw the first of his solo albums reach the top 10 in 2007, however he was part of the line-up of Pulp for their 2001 album We Love Life which peaked at the number 6 spot.

The Traveling Wilburys consisted of four notable singers with decades of success behind them - George Harrison (The Beatles), Tom Petty (Tom Petty and the Heartbreakers), Jeff Lynne (ELO) and Bob Dylan. The Traveling Wilburys Collection was a boxset of their two studio albums (Traveling Wilburys Vol. 1 and Traveling Wilburys Vol. 3), neither of which reached the top ten on their first release in 1988 and 1990 respectively.

Best-selling albums
Amy Winehouse had the best-selling album of the year with Back to Black. The album spent fifty-four weeks in the top 10 (including three weeks at number one), sold over 1.586 million copies and was certified 6× platinum by the BPI. Spirit by Leona Lewis came in second place. Mika's Life in Cartoon Motion, Beautiful World from Take That and Back Home by Westlife made up the top five. Albums by Eagles, Kaiser Chiefs, Arctic Monkeys, Timbaland and Rihanna were also in the top ten best-selling albums of the year.

Top-ten albums
Key

Entries by artist
The following table shows artists who achieved two or more top 10 entries in 2007, including albums that reached their peak in 2006. The figures only include main artists, with featured artists and appearances on compilation albums not counted individually for each artist. The total number of weeks an artist spent in the top ten in 2007 is also shown.

Notes

 This Is the Life reached its peak of number-one on 19 January 2008 (week ending).
 Raising Sand reached its peak of number two on 2 February 2008 (week ending).
 Back to Black: Deluxe Edition reached its peak of number-one on 8 March 2008 (week ending).
 I'm Not Dead re-entered the top 10 at number 6 on 6 January 2007 (week ending) for 2 weeks.
 Under the Iron Sea re-entered the top 10 at number 8 on 3 February 2007 (week ending) for 2 weeks.
 Loose re-entered the top 10 at number 9 on 3 March 2007 (week ending) for 3 weeks, at number 6 on 31 March 2007 (week ending) for 7 weeks and at number 7 on 14 July 2007 (week ending) for 3 weeks.
 Razorlight re-entered the top 10 at number 9 on 24 February 2007 (week ending).
 Alright, Still re-entered the top 10 at number 6 on 27 January 2007 (week ending) for 2 weeks and at number 7 on 3 March 2007 (week ending) for 2 weeks.
 These Streets re-entered the top 10 at number 9 on 13 January 2007 (week ending) for 4 weeks and at number 10 on 1 September 2007 (week ending) for 2 weeks.
 Undiscovered re-entered the top 10 at number 8 on 6 January 2007 (week ending) for 9 weeks.
 FutureSex/LoveSounds re-entered the top 10 at number 9 on 31 March 2007 (week ending) for 2 weeks and at number 7 on 21 April 2007 (week ending) for 3 weeks.
 Costello Music re-entered the top 10 at number 6 on 13 January 2007 (week ending) for 4 weeks and at number 10 on 3 March 2007 (week ending).
 Sam's Town re-entered the top 10 at number 6 on 3 March 2007 (week ending) for 3 weeks and at number 9 on 7 July 2007 (week ending).
 Back to Black re-entered the top 10 at number 2 on 13 January 2007 (week ending) for 28 weeks, at number 8 on 28 July 2007 (week ending) for 18 weeks and at number 9 on 8 December 2007 (week ending) for 7 weeks.
 Beautiful World re-entered the top 10 at number 5 on 24 February 2007 (week ending) for 10 weeks, at number 9 on 24 November 2007 (week ending) for 2 weeks and at number 10 on 15 December 2007 (week ending) for 8 weeks.
 The Good, the Bad & the Queen was recorded by an unnamed supergroup consisting of Damon Albarn, Tony Allen, Paul Simonon and Simon Tong, although the album cover credits it to a group of the same name.
 Life in Cartoon Motion re-entered the top 10 at number 10 on 7 April 2007 (week ending), at number 8 on 21 April 2007 (week ending) for 8 weeks, at number 4 on 28 July 2007 (week ending) for 9 weeks, at number 10 on 17 November 2007 (week ending), at number 9 on 5 January 2008 (week ending) for 5 weeks and at number 9 on 23 February 2008 (week ending) for 4 weeks.
 Love Songs: A Compilation… Old and New originally peaked at number 9 upon its initial release in 2004.
 How to Save a Life re-entered the top 10 at number 9 on 7 April 2007 (week ending).
 Yours Truly, Angry Mob re-entered the top 10 at number 10 on 2 June 2007 (week ending) for 2 weeks.
 Everytime We Touch - The Album re-entered the top 10 at number 9 on 2 June 2007 (week ending) for 2 weeks.
 Because of the Times re-entered the top 10 at number 10 on 21 July 2007 (week ending) for 5 weeks.
 The Best of The Proclaimers originally peaked outside the top ten at number 30 upon its initial release in 2002.
 Timbaland Presents: Shock Value re-entered the top 10 at number 5 on 28 July 2007 (week ending) for 7 weeks, at number 9 on 17 November 2007 (week ending) and at number 10 on 12 January 2008 (week ending).
 Version re-entered the top 10 at number 7 on 4 August 2007 (week ending) for 2 weeks, at number 8 on 27 October 2007 (week ending) for 3 weeks and at number 4 on 1 March 2008 (week ending) for 4 weeks.
 B'Day re-entered the top 10 at number 8 on 5 May 2007 (week ending).
 Call Me Irresponsible has two separate entries in the UK Albums Chart, one as a standard edition, and one as a special edition. Combining both editions, the album spent 12 non-consecutive weeks in the UK top 10 altogether. The special edition entered the top 10 at number 3 on 22 December 2007 (week ending), re-entered at number 6 on 23 February 2008 (week ending) and re-entered at number 4 on 8 March 2008 (week ending).
 Wait for Me re-entered the top 10 at number 9 on 1 September 2007 (week ending) for 2 weeks.
 Never Forget – The Ultimate Collection originally peaked at number 2 upon its initial release in 2005.
 Good Girl Gone Bad re-entered the top 10 at number 10 on 4 August 2007 (week ending), at number 10 on 25 August 2007 (week ending), at number 6 on 8 September 2007 (week ending) for 2 weeks, at number 9 on 26 January 2008 (week ending) for 4 weeks, at number 10 on 1 March 2008 (week ending), at number 10 on 28 June 2008 (week ending), at number 9 on 12 July 2008 (week ending) for 2 weeks, at number 9 on 16 August 2008 (week ending) for 3 weeks and at number 5 on 13 September 2008 (week ending) for 7 weeks.
 This Is the Life re-entered the top 10 at number 6 on 12 January 2008 (week ending) for 7 weeks and at number 10 on 15 March 2008 (week ending) for 2 weeks.
 Hand Built by Robots re-entered the top 10 at number 7 on 19 January 2008 (week ending) for 4 weeks.
 All the Lost Souls re-entered the top 10 at number 8 on 12 April 2008 (week ending).
 ...Hits originally peaked at number-one upon its initial release in 1998.
 The Trick to Life re-entered the top 10 at number 8 on 12 January 2008 (week ending) and at number 8 on 26 January 2008 (week ending) for 3 weeks.
 Raising Sand re-entered the top 10 at number 6 on 19 January 2008 (week ending) for 5 weeks.
 The Ultimate Collection (Whitney Houston) re-entered the top 10 at number 10 on 8 December 2007 (week ending) for 3 weeks.
 Spirit re-entered the top 10 at number 4 on 22 March 2008 (week ending) for 8 weeks and at number-one on 29 November 2008 (week ending) for 9 weeks.
 Back to Black: Deluxe Edition re-entered the top 10 at number 3 on 1 March 2008 (week ending) for 8 weeks, at number 10 on 8 May 2008 (week ending) and at number 7 on 12 July 2008 (week ending) for 2 weeks.
 Figure includes a top 10 album with the group Genesis.
 Figure includes album that peaked in 2006.

See also
2007 in British music
List of number-one albums from the 2000s (UK)

References
General

Specific

External links
2007 album chart archive at the Official Charts Company (click on relevant week)

United Kingdom top 10 albums
Top 10 albums
2007